The Art of Success is a play by the British playwright Nick Dear, centered on the life of William Hogarth. It premiered at the Royal Shakespeare Company in 1986, with Michael Kitchen playing Hogarth and Niamh Cusack playing his wife, Jane. It premiered to an American audience at the Manhattan Theatre Club in December 1989, with Tim Curry playing Hogarth and Mary-Louise Parker playing Jane. Both productions were directed by Adrian Noble.

Original cast
Jane Hogarth - Niamh Cusack
William Hogarth - Michael Kitchen
Henry Fielding - Philip Franks
Frank - David Killick
Oliver - Simon Russell Beale
Mrs. Needham - Dilys Laye
Louisa - Dinah Stabb
Sarah Sprackling - Penny Downie
Robert Walpole - Joe Melia
Queen Caroline - Susan Porrett

References

External links
The Art of Success at Drama Online Library

1986 plays
English plays
Plays based on real people
Plays set in the 18th century
Cultural depictions of William Hogarth